Myceligenerans halotolerans is a halotolerant bacterium from the genus Myceligenerans which has been isolated from a salt lake in Xinjiang province, China.

References

Further reading

External links
Type strain of Myceligenerans halotolerans at BacDive -  the Bacterial Diversity Metadatabase	

Micrococcales
Bacteria described in 2011
Halophiles